The Prix Félix-Robin is a prize awarded by the Société française de physique to reward a physicist for a career’s work.

The prize originated from the will of the engineer Félix Robin. He donated money aimed at rewarding remarkable scientific work carried out by a Frenchman in France. The prize was first awarded in 1922.

Laureates 
 Institut d'optique (1917)
 Maurice de Broglie (1922)
 Jean Cabannes (1924)
 F. Croze (1926)
 Antonin Andant (1928)
 D. Chalonge (1930)
 Étienne Hirsch (1931)
 G. Foex (1932)
 A. Dauvillier (1934)
 Henri Adolphe Gondet (1936)
 Louis Néel (1938)
 Jean-Paul Mathieu (1940)
 Louis Leprince-Ringuet (1942)
 Albert Arnulf (1944)
 Alfred Kastler (1946)
 Gaston Dupouy (1948)
 Henri Bizette (1950)
 Jacques Yvon (1952)
 Jean Brossel (1954)
 Georges-Albert Boutry (1956)
 Pierre Biquard (1958)
 Maurice Lévy (1959)
 Pierre Dufieux (1960)
 Serge Nikitine (1961)
 Maurice Françon (1962)
 Jacques Friedel (1963)
 L. Weill (1964)
 Raimond Castaing (1965)
 Michel Soutif (1966)
 Jacques Thirion (1967)
 Claude Bloch (1968)
 Ionel Solomon (1969)
 André Herpin (1970)
 Évry Schatzman (1971)
 Vittorio Luzzati (1972)
 Charles peyrou (1973)
 Pierre Aigrain (1974)
 Louis Michel (1975)
 Jacques prentki (1976)
 Bernard Cagnac (1977)
 Henri benoit (1978)
 Jean-Louis Steinberg (1979)
 Bernard Jacrot (1980)
 Marianne Lambert (1981)
 Marc Lefort (1982)
 Pierre Marin (1983)
 Jacques des Cloizeaux (1984)
 James lequeux (1985)
 Claude Mercier (1986)
 Gérard Mainfray (1987)
 Claude Itzykson (1988)
 Sidney Leach (1989)
 Bernard Jancovici (1990)
 Claude Benoit à la Guillaume (1991)
 André Samain (1992)
 Georges Amsel (1993)
 Yves Petroff (1994)
 Pierre Bareyre (1995)
 Jean-Michel Besson (1996)
 Alain Omont (1997)
 Anne-Marie Levelut (1998)
 Michel Spiro (1999)
 François Ducastelle (2000)
 Jacques Haissinsky (2001)
 Jacques Bauche (2002)
 Dominique Levesque (2003)
 Liliane Léger (2004)
 Michel Lannoo (2005)
 Claude Boccara (2006)
 Jean-Eudes Augustin (2007)
 Rémi Jullien (2008)
 Michel Dyakonov (2009)
 Élisabeth Giacobino (2010)
 Henri Godfrin (2011)
 Jean-Pierre Lasota (2012)
 Jean-Pierre Gauyacq (2013)
 Sydney Galès (2014)
 Pawel Pieranski (2015)

References

Physics awards
French science and technology awards